This article refers to the waterfalls and gorge. For the state park, see Tallulah Gorge State Park, for the town, see Tallulah Falls, Georgia, for the lake, see Lake Tallulah Falls and for the river, see Tallulah River.

The Tallulah Gorge is a gorge formed by the Tallulah River cutting through the Tallulah Dome rock formation. The Tallulah Gorge is located next to the town of Tallulah Falls, Georgia. Tallulah Gorge State Park protects much of the gorge and its waterfalls. The gorge is one of the Seven Natural Wonders of Georgia.

Just above the falls is Tallulah Falls Lake, created in 1913 by a hydroelectric dam built by Georgia Railway and Power (now Georgia Power) in order to run Atlanta's streetcars.  The dam still collects and redirects most of the water via a  tunnel sluice or penstock around the falls to a 72 MW hydropower electricity generation station downstream that is  lower than the lake, except for a few days each year.  The days when water is released are very popular for recreation, such as kayaking and whitewater rafting.

History
Since the early 19th century, Tallulah Gorge and its waterfalls have been a tourist attraction. In 1882, Tallulah Falls Railway was built, increasing the accessibility of the area to tourists from Atlanta and south Georgia, and the gorge became North Georgia's first tourist attraction. Resort hotels and bars sprang up to serve the tourist trade which, after the addition of the railway, swelled to as many as 2,000 people on any given Sunday. In 1883, tightrope walker Professor Bachman crossed the gorge as part of a publicity stunt for one hotel. On July 18, 1970, Karl Wallenda became the second man to walk across the gorge on a tightrope.

In the 1910s, Georgia Railway and Power began building dams on the river. The town of Burton, Georgia, was purchased and flooded as Lake Burton in 1919. Many area residents opposed the dams, including the widow of Confederate general James Longstreet, Helen Dortch Longstreet, who led a campaign in 1911 to have Tallulah Gorge protected by the state. The Georgia Assembly was unable to raise the $1 million required to purchase the gorge; Longstreet's unsuccessful campaign was one of the first conservation movements in Georgia.  When the dam was completed in 1913, the roar of the Tallulah Falls (the roar could be heard for miles from the gorge) was quieted, and tourism dwindled.  The park was created by Georgia governor Zell Miller in cooperation with Georgia Power.

Although tourism promoters in the late 19th century described the word Tallulah as meaning "loud waters" in Cherokee, it actually has no meaning in that language. Talula is the Itsate Creek word for a small town with one mound. The same word in Muskogee-Creek is talufa. Some references state that the word tallulah means "leaping water" in Choctaw. However, the Choctaw word for water is oka.

Tallulah Falls in popular culture

The opening credits of the 1976 film Grizzly were filmed flying through the gorge, and several establishing shots were shot in one of the gift shops on the gorge rim.
On July 18, 1970, a 65-year-old Karl Wallenda performed a high-wire walk across the Tallulah Gorge.
Parts of the 1972 film Deliverance were filmed in the gorge.
Parts of the 2018 film Avengers: Infinity War were filmed in the state park.

Geology and ecology

Tallulah Dome is a rock formation caused by the double folding of the Earth's crust during the formation of Pangaea, about 500 to 250 million years ago. The dome is made up of mostly quartzite along with schist.

Because of the variation in sunlight, shade, and moisture caused by the steep cliffs, several different ecosystems exist in and around the canyon-like gorge. The persistent trillium, an endangered species of trillium, grows in this river basin and only few other parts of the South Carolina/Georgia area.

Additional photographs

References

Sources
Edwards, Leslie. "Tallulah Gorge Article." Georgia Botanical Society. Accessed January 20, 2006.
Georgia Botanical Society-Home Page 
Tallulah Falls and Gorge, New Georgia Encyclopedia
Tallulah Gorge State Park, About North Georgia

External links

ParkMaps website

Seven Natural Wonders of Georgia (U.S. state)
Canyons and gorges of Georgia (U.S. state)
Protected areas of Habersham County, Georgia
Protected areas of Rabun County, Georgia
Waterfalls of Georgia (U.S. state)
Landforms of Rabun County, Georgia